Eristena chrysozonalis is a moth in the family Crambidae. It was described by George Hampson in 1912. It is found in India (Chennai).

References

Acentropinae
Moths described in 1912